Charles Anderson Worsley Anderson-Pelham, 2nd Earl of Yarborough (12 April 1809 – 7 January 1862) was a British nobleman who succeeded to the Earldom of Yarborough in 1846.

Before his accession, he was the Member of Parliament (MP) for Newtown 1830–1831, Lincolnshire 1831–1832 and North Lincolnshire 1835–1846.

Lord Yarborough gave his name to a hand of cards dealt in contract bridge that has no card higher than a nine (see Yarborough). The Earl offered £1,000 to anyone who achieved a "Yarborough" – on condition they paid him £1 each time they did not succeed!

References

External links 
 

1809 births
1862 deaths
2
Lord-Lieutenants of Lincolnshire
Worsley, Charles Anderson-Pelham, Lord
Anderson-Pelham, Charles
Anderson-Pelham, Charles
Anderson-Pelham, Charles
Worsley, Charles Anderson-Pelham, Lord
Worsley, Charles Anderson-Pelham, Lord
UK MPs who inherited peerages